Barbara Hoyt (December 27, 1951 – December 3, 2017) was a member of the "Manson Family", led by Charles Manson.

Hoyt was a witness in District Attorney Vincent Bugliosi's prosecution of Manson and his followers for the Tate-LaBianca murders, one of the highest-profile murder trials in history.

Life 
Hoyt lived with the Manson Family at Spahn Ranch.

In 1971, five Manson followers — Catherine Share, Lynette Fromme, Dennis Rice, Steve Grogan and Ruth Ann Moorehouse — were charged with attempted murder after they plotted to murder Hoyt to prevent her testifying for the prosecution during the Tate/LaBianca murder trial.

Moorehouse was to lure Hoyt to Honolulu, Hawaii, so that she would be unable to testify. Once in Hawaii, if Hoyt could not be convinced not to testify, Moorehouse was to kill her. On September 9, 1970, as Moorehouse was preparing to board her flight back to California, it was alleged that Moorehouse bought Hoyt a hamburger and laced it with a multi-dose of LSD, then left her and flew back to California. Hoyt survived the attempt on her life.

Share and the others were initially charged with attempted murder; the charge was later reduced to conspiracy to dissuade a witness from testifying.

Share, Fromme, Rice, and Grogan served 90-day sentences in the Los Angeles County Jail. Moorehouse never served her sentence, as she failed to appear at the sentencing hearing.

After Hoyt had pursued a career in nursing, she had become friends with Sharon Tate's sister, Debra.

Death 
Hoyt died of natural causes on December 3, 2017 at the age of 65.

References

External links
Barbara Hoyt

1951 births
2017 deaths
Deaths from kidney failure
Manson Family
People from Coeur d'Alene, Idaho